Blue Desert is a 1991 American psychological thriller film directed by Bradley Battersby and starring Courteney Cox and D. B. Sweeney. The original music score is composed by Joel Goldsmith. The filming locations were Inyokern, California and Red Rock Canyon State Park, Cantil, California.

Plot summary

A rape victim, comic book artist Lisa Roberts is given the runaround by the New York City Police Department. Tired with city life, she heads for the wide open spaces of Arizona. Not long afterward, she is propositioned by lowlife Randall Atkins. She reports this to sympathetic local policeman Steve Smith, who replies matter-of-factly that this is not the first time that Atkins has been accused of a sexual offense.

To her amazement, Roberts is later visited by Atkins, who agitatedly warns her not to trust the sweet-natured policeman. Someone is lying about something, and Roberts plainly does not know what to believe. When she finds out, it is nearly too late.

Main cast
 Courteney Cox – Lisa Roberts
 D. B. Sweeney – Steve Smith
 Craig Sheffer – Randall Atkins
 Sandy Ward – Walter
 Philip Baker Hall – Joe

Reception
Kevin Thomas of the Los Angeles Times compared Blue Desert positively to Thelma & Louise, calling it "taut and terrific".

References

External links
 
 
 

1991 films
1991 independent films
1990s psychological thriller films
American psychological thriller films
American independent films
Films scored by Joel Goldsmith
Films about fictional painters
Films about comics
Films set in Arizona
1990s English-language films
1990s American films
English-language thriller films